Jonatan Alberto Morán (born 14 April 1989) is an Argentine professional footballer who plays as a forward for Liga Nacional club Guastatoya.

Career
Morán played in Mexican football in 2011 with Mérida. He made eight substitute appearances in the 2010–11 Liga de Ascenso season, including for his senior debut on 15 January 2011 versus Irapuato. After spending 2013–14 in Torneo Argentino B with 25 de Mayo, where he scored once in eleven fixtures, Morán joined Deportivo Roca of Torneo Federal A. He scored four goals in his first seven appearances, netting in matches against CAI, Independiente, General Belgrano and Guillermo Brown. He remained for three seasons, featuring in fifty-two games and scoring nine. Morán joined Alvarado on loan for the 2016 play-offs.

After further stints in the regionalised tier three with Gimnasia y Esgrima and Cipolletti, Morán moved across to the other third division after agreeing terms with Primera B Metropolitana side Barracas Central. His first appearance arrived in a 5–1 win over Defensores Unidos, in a campaign which ended with promotion as champions to the 2019–20 Primera B Nacional. After leaving Barracas soon after, in June 2019, he subsequently joined La Amistad of Liga Confluencia. Morán left in January 2020, after agreeing terms with Primera C Metropolitana team Real Pilar. He scored his first goal in a win over Deportivo Español.

Career statistics
.

Honours
Barracas Central
Primera B Metropolitana: 2018–19

La Amistad
Liga Confluencia: 2019 Clausura

References

External links

1989 births
Living people
People from Viedma
Argentine footballers
Association football forwards
Argentine expatriate footballers
Expatriate footballers in Mexico
Argentine expatriate sportspeople in Mexico
Ascenso MX players
Torneo Argentino B players
Torneo Federal A players
Primera B Metropolitana players
Primera C Metropolitana players
C.F. Mérida footballers
Deportivo Roca players
Club Atlético Alvarado players
Gimnasia y Esgrima de Mendoza footballers
Club Cipolletti footballers
Barracas Central players
Real Pilar Fútbol Club players
Deportivo Merlo footballers
Club Atlético Los Andes footballers